The Heritage Range is a major mountain range,  long and  wide, situated southward of Minnesota Glacier and forming the southern half of the Ellsworth Mountains in Antarctica. The range is complex, consisting of scattered ridges and peaks of moderate height, escarpments, hills and nunataks, with the various units of relief set off by numerous intervening glaciers.

The northern portion of the range was probably first sighted by Lincoln Ellsworth in the course of his trans-Antarctic flight of November 23, 1935. On December 14, 1959, the southern range was seen for the first time in a reconnaissance flight from Byrd Station, made by Edward C. Thiel, J. C. Craddock and E. S. Robinson. The team landed at a glacier on Pipe Peak, in the northwestern part of the range, on December 26.

During the 1962–63 and 1963–64 seasons, the University of Minnesota expeditions made geologic and cartographic surveys of the range. The entire range was mapped by USGS from aerial photographs taken by the U.S. Navy, 1961–66.

The Heritage range was so named by US-ACAN because topographic units within the range have received names relating to the theme of American heritage.

Maps
 Union Glacier. Scale 1:250 000 topographic map. Reston, Virginia: US Geological Survey, 1966.
 Liberty Hills. Scale 1:250 000 topographic map. Reston, Virginia: US Geological Survey, 1966.
 Antarctic Digital Database (ADD). Scale 1:250000 topographic map of Antarctica. Scientific Committee on Antarctic Research (SCAR). Since 1993, regularly updated.

Features
Geographical features include:

Anderson Massif

Douglas Peaks

Dunbar Ridge

Edson Hills

Enterprise Hills

Founders Peaks

Smith Ridge

Other Founders Peaks features

Frazier Ridge

Gifford Peaks

Independence Hills

Liberty Hills (Antarctica)

Meyer Hills

Pioneer Heights

Gross Hills

Inferno Ridge

Nimbus Hills

Samuel Nunataks

Other Nimbus Hills features

Other Pioneer Heights features

Soholt Peaks

Watlack Hills

Webers Peaks

Other features

 Barrett Nunataks
 Bingham Peak
 Cagle Peaks
 Carnell Peak
 Charles Peak
 Cunningham Peak
 Dott Ice Rise
 Driscoll Glacier
 Dybvadskog Peak
 Founders Escarpment
 Fusco Nunatak
 Gould Spur
 Gowan Glacier
 Hall Peak
 Hercules Inlet
 Herrin Peak
 High Nunatak
 Hoinkes Peak
 Hutto Peak
 Landmark Peak
 Linder Peak
 Matney Peak
 Mhire Spur
 Minnesota Glacier
 Mount Bursik
 Mount Johns
 Mount Rodger
 Mount Twiss
 Mount Woollard
 Navigator Peak
 Planck Point
 Robinson Peak
 Rutford Ice Stream
 Schneider Glacier
 Thompson Nunataks
 Three Sails
 Unger Peak
 Weaver Nunataks
 White Escarpment
 Wilson Nunataks
 Zavis Peak

References

External links

Ellsworth Mountains
Mountain ranges of Ellsworth Land